Koninklijke Voetbal Vereniging Crossing Elewijt is a Belgian association football club from the village of Elewijt in the municipality of Zemst, Flemish Brabant. It plays at the eighth level in the Belgian football league system, i.e. in the 3rd division of the regional league of Brabant as of 2014–15.

History
The club was founded in Ganshoren (North-West of Brussels) as Crossing F.C. Ganshoren in 1913 and was given the matricule n°55 by the Royal Belgian Football Association. R. Crossing F.C. Ganshoren changed its name in 1959 to become R. Crossing Club Molenbeek as it moved to Sint-Jans-Molenbeek, Brussels.

Two years later the club qualified for the second division and finished 5th.  It then reached the third place in 1967 and the second two seasons after to qualify for the first division.  Before the beginning of the first season of the matricule number 55 at the highest level, in 1969 Crossing merged with R.C.S. Schaarbeek to become the famous R. Crossing Club Schaarbeek located in Schaerbeek. The spell in the first division only lasted for 4 seasons and then the club decayed.

In 1991 it merged with V.V. Elewijt to become the K.V.V. Crossing Elewijt.

External links 
 Official site 
 Belgian football clubs history
 RSSSF Archive – 1st and 2nd division final tables

 
Association football clubs established in 1913
Football clubs in Belgium
1913 establishments in Belgium
Belgian Pro League clubs